Kamalanagar is a township in Lawngtlai district in the state of Mizoram in India. It is located on the western bank of river Toizung in Tuichawng subdivision and facing the other part of Chawngte township, which is located on the eastern bank but in Lawngtlai subdivision of Lawngtlai district and Lunglei district. It is the headquarters of Chakma Autonomous District Council which covers the Tuichawng subdivision of Lawngtlai district, one of the three autonomous district councils within Mizoram. It is located in the south-western part of the state.

Villages
Kamalanagar under Chakma Autonomous District Council covers the Kamalanagar - I, Kamalanagar - II, Kamalanagar - III and Kamalanagar - IV villages while Chawngte-P comes under Lawngtlai subdivision which lies in Lai Autonomous District Council and Chawnge-L in Lunglei district.

Demographics 

As of the 2011 Census of India, the population of Kamalanagar is 6328, with 1184 Households. There are 3251 males (52%) and 3077 females (49%), with 5997 (95% ) Scheduled Tribes. The population mostly consists of Chakma people who primarily follow Theravada Buddhism.

Education 
There is one college Kamalanagar College, under Mizoram University and a number of public and private schools.

Connectivity 
It is 92 km west of the district headquarters Lawngtlai, and 317 km from the state capital Aizawl.

References

External links 
 CADC-Chakma Autonomous District Council(CADC)
 CADC at a glance- CADC Headquarters
 Kamalanagar subpost office- Kamalanagar PO

Cities and towns in Lawngtlai district